Route 110 or Highway 110 can refer to multiple roads:

Australia
  Nepean Highway
  Bellarine Highway

Bangladesh

Brazil
 BR-110

Canada
  Manitoba Highway 110
  New Brunswick Route 110
  Prince Edward Island Route 110

China
  China National Highway 110

Costa Rica
 National Route 110

Croatia
  D110 road (Croatia)

France
 A110 autoroute (Under Planning)

India

Ireland
 R110 road (Ireland)

Korea, South
 Second Gyeongin Expressway

Malaysia
Jalan Kota Baharu (Perak Route A110)
Jalan Peradin (Johor Route J110)

Netherlands
 S110 (Amsterdam)

Pakistan
 N-110 National Highway

Philippines
 N110 highway (Philippines)

Spain
  N-110 road (Spain)

Turkey
 State road D110 (Turkey)

United States
 Interstate 110 (California)
 Interstate 110 (California 1958–1968) (former)
 Interstate 110 (Florida)
 Interstate 110 (Louisiana)
 Interstate 110 (Mississippi)
 Interstate 110 (Texas)
 U.S. Route 110 (former)
 U.S. Route 110 (Indiana–Michigan) (former proposal)
 Alabama State Route 110
 Arkansas Highway 110
 California State Route 110
 Colorado State Highway 110
 Connecticut Route 110
 County Road 110 (Duval County, Florida)
 Georgia State Route 110
 Illinois Route 110
 Illinois Route 110 (1923) (former)
 Illinois Route 110 (1940s) (former)
 Indiana State Road 110
 Iowa Highway 110
 K-110 (Kansas highway)
 Kentucky Route 110
 Louisiana Highway 110
 Maine State Route 110
 Maryland Route 110 (former)
 Massachusetts Route 110
 M-110 (Michigan highway) (former)
 Minnesota State Highway 110 (former)
 Missouri Route 110
 Missouri Route 110 (CKC)
 Nebraska Highway 110
  New Hampshire Route 110
  New Hampshire Route 110A
  New Hampshire Route 110B
 County Route 110 (Bergen County, New Jersey)
 County Route S110 (Bergen County, New Jersey)
 New Mexico State Road 110
 New York State Route 110
 County Route 110 (Dutchess County, New York)
 County Route 110 (Fulton County, New York)
 County Route 110 (Nassau County, New York)
 County Route 110 (Niagara County, New York)
 County Route 110 (Rockland County, New York)
 County Route 110 (Saratoga County, New York)
 County Route 110 (Seneca County, New York)
 County Route 110 (Suffolk County, New York)
 County Route 110 (Tompkins County, New York)
 County Route 110 (Wayne County, New York)
 North Carolina Highway 110
 Ohio State Route 110
 Oklahoma State Highway 110
 Pennsylvania Route 110
 Rhode Island Route 110
 South Carolina Highway 110
 Tennessee State Route 110
 Texas State Highway 110
 Texas State Highway Loop 110
 Farm to Market Road 110
 Utah State Route 110
 Vermont Route 110
 Virginia State Route 110
 Virginia State Route 110 (1928-1933) (former)
 Virginia State Route 110 (1933-1946) (former)
 Virginia State Route 110 (1947-1956) (former)
 Washington State Route 110
 Washington State Route 110 (1967) (former)
 Wisconsin Highway 110
 Wyoming Highway 110

Territories
 Puerto Rico Highway 110
 Puerto Rico Highway 110R (former)

See also
A110
B110
D110 road
P110